Balanescu Quartet is an avant-garde string ensemble formed in 1987. Current members are Alexander Bălănescu (violin), James Shenton (violin), Helen Kamminga (viola) and Nick Holland (cello).

Group history  
The Balanescu Quartet is a contemporary music ensemble formed in 1987. Its guiding force has been the Romanian virtuoso violinist and composer Alexander Balanescu, who has led the quartet across musical frontiers into new uncharted territory. This search to push the limits of the string quartet, has revealed an ensemble nearer to a band rather than a classical group, and reflects Balanescu's passionate belief in the intercommunication and fluidity between different musical fields.

From its roots as collaborators with composers such as Michael Nyman and Gavin Bryars, through projects with Lounge Lizard John Lurie, Jack de Johnette, Ornette Coleman, David Byrne, the Pet Shop Boys, Spiritualized, Kate Bush and Kraftwerk, they have developed their own unique writing and performing style setting them apart from any other string quartet. Their live performances are notable for their sheer energy and dynamism. They have played in locations as wildly contrasting as London's South Bank Centre and New York's Knitting Factory - they even opened to 10000 Pet Shop Boys fans at Wembley Arena, and are constantly looking for venues in which to present their music in a new context. They performed the current version of University Challenges title music (since 2000) on BBC2 in the UK.

Their early albums were on Mute Records and Argo Records (UK).

Recordings 

Possessed (1992)
 Luminitza (1994)
 Angels & Insects (1995) (soundtrack)
 East Meets East (1997)
 Maria T (2005)
 This Is The Balanescu Quartet (2011)
 Balanescu (2019)

 Michael Nyman - String Quartets 1-3 - featuring the Balanescu Quartet (1991)
 Balanescu Quartet Play Byrne/Moran/Lurie/Torke - featuring David Byrne, Robert Moran, John Lurie and Michael Torke (1992)
 Geoff Smith - Gas • Food • Lodging - featuring the Balanescu Quartet (1993)
 Kevin Volans - String Quartets Nos. 2 & 3 - performed by the Balanescu Quartet (1994)
 Gavin Bryars - The Last Days - featuring the Balanescu Quartet (1995)
 Spiritualized - Pure Phase (1995)
 Rabih Abou-Khalil - Arabian Waltz - featuring the Balanescu String Quartet (2002)
 Optimo - How To Kill The DJ (Part 2) - featuring music by the Balanescu Quartet (2004)
 Michael Torke - Six - featuring the Balanescu Quartet (2005)
 Stateless - Matilda featuring the Balanescu Quartet (2011)
 Ada Milea & Alexander Balanescu - The Island - featuring the Balanescu Quartet (2011)
 Teho Teardo - Diaz  - featuring the Balanescu Quartet (2012) (soundtrack)

References

External links 
 balanescu.com
 https://www.facebook.com/BalanescuQuartet/

Musical groups established in 1987
English string quartets
Romanian musical groups
Contemporary classical music ensembles
Mute Records artists